Fionn McLoughlin (born 6 September 1982) is an Irish rugby union player. He has represented both Ireland and Wales at youth level. He plays centre, winger and fly half. He is the son of former Ireland and British Lions prop Gerry McLoughlin.

Early life 
Born in Limerick, Republic of Ireland on 6 September 1982, McLoughlin grew up in Wales where his father was a teacher. In 1999, he played for Cardinal Newman Roman Catholic School in Rhydyfelin in the Welsh Schools Under-18 Cup Final at the Millennium Stadium in Cardiff.

Career 
McLoughlin started his career at Shannon RFC where he played for Irish region Munster Rugby He also played for Galwegians RFC and Connacht Rugby in 2001. In 2002, McLoughlin moved to Welsh club Caerphilly RFC where he took part in their 2002-03 European Shield campaign. In 2007, McLoughlin moved to Pontypridd RFC on a dual-registration with Llanharan RFC. In 2008, McLoughlin joined Bedwas RFC owing to limited opportunities at Pontypridd. In 2009, McLoughlin returned to Ireland to rejoin Shannon where he helped them win the All-Ireland League. During the [Northern Hemisphere] summer, he played in Australia for the University of Western Australia RUFC.

Later that year, he had a trial with English RFU Championship team Plymouth Albion R.F.C., where he was signed permanently.  In 2015, McLoughlin was signed by National League 2 South Old Elthamians. In 2017, McLoughlin joined Tunbridge Wells RFC, where he played a part in them achieving a second successive promotion.

International career 
McLoughlin has represented both the Wales national under-18 rugby union team and the Ireland national under-19 rugby union team at international level. He was also called up for the Ireland Club XV against England Counties XV.

References 

1982 births
Living people
Caerphilly RFC players
Connacht Rugby players
Galwegians RFC players
Irish expatriate rugby union players
Irish rugby union players
Llanharan RFC players
Munster Rugby players
Plymouth Albion R.F.C. players
Rugby union players from County Limerick
Shannon RFC players
Rugby union centres